Studujeme za školou is a 1939 Czechoslovak comedy film, directed by Miroslav Cikán. It stars Svatopluk Beneš, František Filipovský and Nataša Gollová.

References

External links
Studujeme za školou at the Internet Movie Database

1939 films
Czechoslovak comedy films
1939 comedy films
Films directed by Miroslav Cikán
Czechoslovak black-and-white films
1930s Czech films